The British Academy Video Games Award for Family is an award presented annually by the British Academy of Film and Television Arts (BAFTA). It is given in honor to "the best game experience for a family audience, whether played as individuals or as a group", the category is open for games with a PEGI age rating of 12 or under. 

The category was first presented in 2004 at the 1st British Academy Games Awards under the name Children's Game to EyeToy: Play. The category has gone through several name changes since its inception, being known as Casual at the 4th and 5th British Academy Games Awards, while for the 6th edition, it was presented as Family & Social. Since the 7th British Academy Games Awards in 2008, it has been awarded under its current name. As developers, Nintendo EAD have received the most nominations in the category, with fourteen and are tied with Media Molecule for most wins, with two each. Ubisoft hold the record for most nominations without a win, with five. For publishers, Sony Interactive Entertainment lead the nominees with twenty five, tied with Nintendo for most wins, as each have five. Activision have the most nominations without a win, with eight.

The current holder of the award is Chicory: A Colorful Tale by Greg Lobanov and Finji, which won at the 18th British Academy Games Awards in 2022.

Winners and nominees
In the following table, the years are listed as per BAFTA convention, and generally correspond to the year of game release in the United Kingdom.

Multiple nominations and wins

Developers

Publishers

References

External links
Official website

Family